Nesta Devine (born 1947) is a New Zealand education academic. She is currently a full professor at the Auckland University of Technology.

Academic career
Devine has a 2000 PhD titled  'An Investigation into 'Public Choice' Theory and its Implications for Education in New Zealand'  from  the University of Auckland. She has taught in schools,  University of Waikato and Auckland University of Technology, rising to full professor.

Selected works
 Devine, Nesta. Education and public choice: A critical account of the invisible hand in education. Greenwood Publishing Group, 2004.
 Devine, Nesta, and Ruth Irwin. "Autonomy, agency and education: He tangata, he tangata, he tangata." Educational Philosophy and Theory 37, no. 3 (2005): 317–331.
 Brown, Tony, Nesta Devine, Elsie Leslie, Margaret Paiti, Emilie Sila'ila'i, Sandra Umaki, and Jay Williams. "Reflective engagement in cultural history: A Lacanian perspective on Pasifika teachers in Aotearoa New Zealand." Pedagogy, Culture & Society 15, no. 1 (2007): 107–118.
 Peters, Michael A., Petar Jandrić, Ruth Irwin, Kirsten Locke, Nesta Devine, Richard Heraud, Andrew Gibbons et al. "Towards a philosophy of academic publishing." Educational Philosophy and Theory 48, no. 14 (2016): 1401–1425.
 Devine, Nesta. "Community, Partnership, and Collaboration." Knowledge Cultures 3, no. 5 (2015): 34–41.

References

External links
 
 

Living people
1947 births
New Zealand women academics
New Zealand educational theorists
University of Auckland alumni
Academic staff of the University of Waikato
Academic staff of the Auckland University of Technology
English emigrants to New Zealand
New Zealand women writers